Blabia is a genus of longhorn beetles of the subfamily Lamiinae, containing the following species:

 Blabia banga Galileo & Martins, 1998
 Blabia bicolor Martins & Galileo, 2005
 Blabia bicuspis (Bates, 1866)
 Blabia bituberosa (Breuning, 1940)
 Blabia colobotheoides Thomson, 1864
 Blabia costaricensis Breuning, 1943
 Blabia cristulata Martins & Galileo, 1995
 Blabia epicharis Martins & Galileo, 1995
 Blabia exotica Martins & Galileo, 1995
 Blabia ferina Martins & Galileo, 1995
 Blabia galba Martins & Galileo, 1995
 Blabia gemma Martins & Galileo, 1995
 Blabia incompta Martins & Galileo, 1995
 Blabia intricata Martins & Galileo, 1995
 Blabia longipennis Galileo & Martins, 2003
 Blabia magdalena Martins & Galileo, 1995
 Blabia masoni (Aurivillius, 1927)
 Blabia meinerti (Aurivillius, 1900)
 Blabia oculifera Martins & Galileo, 1995
 Blabia piscoides (Thomson, 1868)
 Blabia rendira Galileo & Martins, 1998
 Blabia similis (Breuning, 1940)
 Blabia spinella Martins & Galileo, 1995
 Blabia strandiella Breuning, 1943
 Blabia truncata Breuning, 1940

References

 
Desmiphorini